Liber Abaci (also spelled as Liber Abbaci; "The Book of Calculation") is a  historic 1202 Latin manuscript on arithmetic by Leonardo of Pisa, posthumously known as Fibonacci.

Liber Abaci was among the first Western books to describe the Hindu–Arabic numeral system and to use symbols resembling modern "Arabic numerals". By addressing the applications of both commercial tradesmen and mathematicians, it promoted the superiority of the  system, and the use of these glyphs.

Although the book's title is sometimes translated as "The Book of the Abacus",  notes that it is an error to read this as referring to calculating devices called "abacus". Rather, the word "abacus" was used at the time to refer to calculation in any form; the spelling "abbacus" with two "b"s (which is how Leonardo spelt it in the original Latin manuscript) was, and still is in Italy, used to refer to calculation using Hindu-Arabic numerals, which can avoid confusion. The book describes methods of doing calculations without aid of an abacus, and as  confirms, for centuries after its publication the algorismists (followers of the style of calculation demonstrated in Liber Abaci) remained in conflict with the abacists (traditionalists who continued to use the abacus in conjunction with Roman numerals). The historian of mathematics Carl Boyer stated in his History of Mathematics that it is a very thorough treatise on algebraic methods and problems in which the use of the Hindu-Arabic numerals is strongly advocated."

Summary of sections
The first section introduces the Hindu–Arabic numeral system, including methods for converting between different representation systems. This section also includes the first known description of trial division for testing whether a number is composite and, if so, factoring it.

The second section presents examples from commerce, such as conversions of currency and measurements, and calculations of profit and interest.

The third section discusses a number of mathematical problems; for instance, it includes (ch. II.12) the Chinese remainder theorem, perfect numbers and Mersenne primes as well as formulas for arithmetic series and for square pyramidal numbers. Another example in this chapter involves the growth of a population of rabbits, where the solution requires generating a numerical sequence. Although the problem dates back long before Leonardo, its inclusion in his book is why the Fibonacci sequence is named after him today.

The fourth section derives approximations, both numerical and geometrical, of irrational numbers such as square roots.

The book also includes proofs in Euclidean geometry. Fibonacci's method of solving algebraic equations shows the influence of the early 10th-century Egyptian mathematician Abū Kāmil Shujāʿ ibn Aslam.

Fibonacci's notation for fractions
In reading Liber Abaci, it is helpful to understand Fibonacci's notation for rational numbers, a notation that is intermediate in form between the Egyptian fractions commonly used until that time and the vulgar fractions still in use today. There are three key differences between Fibonacci's notation and modern fraction notation.
 Modern notation generally writes a fraction to the right of the whole number to which it is added, for instance  for 7/3. Fibonacci instead would write the same fraction to the left, i.e., .
 Fibonacci used a composite fraction notation in which a sequence of numerators and denominators shared the same fraction bar; each such term represented an additional fraction of the given numerator divided by the product of all the denominators below and to the right of it. The notation was read from right to left. This can be viewed as a form of mixed radix notation, and was very convenient for dealing with traditional systems of weights, measures, and currency. For instance, for units of length, a foot is 1/3 of a yard, and an inch is 1/12 of a foot, so a quantity of 5 yards, 2 feet, and  inches could be represented as a composite fraction:  yards. However, typical notations for traditional measures, while similarly based on mixed radixes, do not write out the denominators explicitly; the explicit denominators in Fibonacci's notation allow him to use different radixes for different problems when convenient. Sigler also points out an instance where Fibonacci uses composite fractions in which all denominators are 10, prefiguring modern decimal notation for fractions.
 Fibonacci sometimes wrote several fractions next to each other, representing a sum of the given fractions. For instance, 1/3+1/4 = 7/12, so a notation like  would represent the number that would now more commonly be written as the mixed number , or simply the improper fraction . Notation of this form can be distinguished from sequences of numerators and denominators sharing a fraction bar by the visible break in the bar. If all numerators are 1 in a fraction written in this form, and all denominators are different from each other, the result is an Egyptian fraction representation of the number. This notation was also sometimes combined with the composite fraction notation: two composite fractions written next to each other would represent the sum of the fractions.

The complexity of this notation allows numbers to be written in many different ways, and Fibonacci described several methods for converting from one style of representation to another. In particular, chapter II.7 contains a list of methods for converting an improper fraction to an Egyptian fraction, including the greedy algorithm for Egyptian fractions, also known as the Fibonacci–Sylvester expansion.

Modus Indorum 

In the Liber Abaci, Fibonacci says the following introducing the affirmative Modus Indorum (the method of the Indians), today known as Hindu–Arabic numeral system or base-10 positional notation. It also introduced digits that greatly resembled the modern Arabic numerals.

As my father was a public official away from our homeland in the Bugia customshouse established for the Pisan merchants who frequently gathered there, he had me in my youth brought to him, looking to find for me a useful and comfortable future; there he wanted me to be in the study of mathematics and to be taught for some days. There from a marvelous instruction in the art of the nine Indian figures, the introduction and knowledge of the art pleased me so much above all else, and I learnt from them, whoever was learned in it, from nearby Egypt, Syria, Greece, Sicily and Provence, and their various methods, to which locations of business I travelled considerably afterwards for much study, and I learnt from the assembled disputations. But this, on the whole, the algorithm and even the Pythagorean arcs, I still reckoned almost an error compared to the Indian method. Therefore strictly embracing the Indian method, and attentive to the study of it, from mine own sense adding some, and some more still from the subtle Euclidean geometric art, applying the sum that I was able to perceive to this book, I worked to put it together in xv distinct chapters, showing certain proof for almost everything that I put in, so that further, this method perfected above the rest, this science is instructed to the eager, and to the Italian people above all others, who up to now are found without a minimum. If, by chance, something less or more proper or necessary I omitted, your indulgence for me is entreated, as there is no one who is without fault, and in all things is altogether circumspect.

The nine Indian figures are: 
9 8 7 6 5 4 3 2 1 
With these nine figures, and with the sign 0 which the Arabs call zephir any number whatsoever is written...

In other words, in his book he advocated the use of the digits 0–9, and of place value. Until this time Europe used Roman Numerals, making modern mathematics almost impossible.  The book thus made an important contribution to the spread of decimal numerals. The spread of the Hindu-Arabic system, however, as Ore writes, was "long-drawn-out", taking many more centuries to spread widely, and did not become complete until the later part of the 16th century, accelerating dramatically only in the 1500s with the advent of printing.

Textual history 
The first appearance of the manuscript was in 1202. No copies of this version are known. A revised version of Liber Abaci,  dedicated to Michael Scot, appeared in 1227 CE. There are at least nineteen manuscripts extant containing parts of this text. There are three complete versions of this manuscript from the thirteenth and fourteenth centuries. There are a further nine incomplete copies known between the thirteenth and fifteenth centuries, and there may be more not yet identified.

There was no known printed version of Liber Abaci until Boncompagni's Italian translation of 1857. The first complete English translation was Sigler's text of 2002.

Notes

References

.
.
. Dover version also available, 1988, .

External links

1202 books
Mathematics books
13th-century Latin books
13th century in science